David Singh is a  fictional character who appears in various DC Comics publications. He is Crime Lab Director for the Central City Police Department, who takes Barry Allen into his lab on Captain Frye's orders.

Singh appears as a recurring cast member on The CW Arrowverse television series The Flash played by Patrick Sabongui. This version is initially the Captain and later Chief of Police of the Central City Police Department. The character also guest starred in an episode of the fifth season of Arrow.

Fictional character biography

David Singh is the director of the crime lab at the Central City Police Department. When he took over, the lab began to emphasize quantity of cases solved over quality, which resulted in the alienation of some longtime scientists, such as Patty Spivot.
Barry Allen is back working for the C.C.P.D. and Captain Fyre has put him under Singh's charge. On his first day back Singh give him the case of the murdered Mirror Monarch. Then later Singh catches Barry looking through the Jason Hicks files, a case that had been closed and already went to trial. Barry explains that Jason's mother came to him for help and accuses Singh of pretending to give a damn about his job.

Singh is about to argue back but James Forrest calls him to his computer. Singh had Forrest check the Mirror Monarch's body for clues and Forrest found blood that did not belong to the victim on his glove. The blood matches Barry Allen, but instead of accusing Barry, Singh yells at him for contaminating the crime scene. He then belittles Barry saying, if he wants to accuse people of being sloppy he should make sure his cases are clean first.

Later Singh notices the Hicks files are missing and so is Barry. Unknown to Singh, Barry gave the file to Iris West-Allen and she did some research and learned that the real murderer was Rory Tork. Once Jason Hicks was freed, Singh re-examined his job and realized he may have closed cases in haste. That is why his first order back in the office is to reopen all closed cases from the past six months.

Road to Flashpoint
David Singh has ordered reopening of every case closed by his department over the last six months, and has ordered his team to work overtime, including Saturdays. He then puts Barry Allen on the possible death case of the Elongated Kid. Later when Patty Spivot returns to the Crime Lab to do Barry a favor, Singh gives her a hard time, but he is happy that she is there to help. David Singh is the Crime Lab Director for the Central City Police Department. He reports directly to Captain Frye, and is not pleased with having to take Barry Allen into his lab on the captain's orders.

Flashpoint
In this alternate reality, Singh is still head of the Central City Police Crime Lab, and he is one of the few people in Central City who believe Citizen Cold is really a murderer and not a hero; all he needs is some cold hard evidence.

The New 52
After the DC event Flashpoint, the entire DC Universe was altered into a five-year timeline. Singh is shown to be the same person he was prior to the New 52 except for several significant details. Upon Barry Allen's apparent death, Singh was put into a far more sympathetic light when he comforted Patty Spivot at his apartment. Singh is also secretly homosexual, being in a relationship with the ex-vigilante Pied Piper, who is a celebrated musician in Central City. Singh is shown to be a very good leader when Central City went under a black-out, dispersing his team out into the city to keep order and just as well getting his hands dirty in keeping the peace. Upon the Rogues battle with The Flash, Piper was injured and Singh was shown by his side during the fight.

In other media
Patrick Sabongui plays David Singh on The CW's The Flash. At the start of the series he is the Captain of CCPD, before being promoted to Chief of Police in the season five finale. He works together with the Flash, eventually figuring out that the superhero is actually his CSI, Barry Allen. This version of the character is gay with a fiancé named Rob. Sabongui has also reprised the role in Arrow and Supergirl. In "Welcome to Earth-2", Barry witnesses Singh's criminal Earth-Two counterpart being arrested.

References

External links

DC Comics television characters
Fictional forensic scientists
Fictional Indian people
Fictional gay males
DC Comics LGBT characters
Fictional LGBT characters in television
Comics characters introduced in 2010
Characters created by Geoff Johns
Central City Police Department officers
Flash (comics) characters